Necessary But Not Sufficient is a 2000 novel authored by Dr. Eliyahu Goldratt and co-authors Eli Schrangenheim and Carol A. Ptak. Necessary But Not Sufficient is written as a "business novel" and shows the fictional application of the theory of constraints to enterprise resource planning (ERP) and operations software and organizations using that software. The fourth of five published Goldratt business novels, this one does not share any of the settings or characters of the previous three novels (only The Goal and It's Not Luck shared the same characters).

Quotes 
"Technology is a necessary condition, but it's not sufficient. To get the benefits at the time that we install the new technology, we must also change the rules that recognize the existence of the limitation." (p. 125)

Editions 
 

2000 novels
Theory of constraints